Campoli may refer to:

 Alfredo Campoli, a famous violinist who was often referred to simply as "Campoli"
 Chris Campoli, a Canadian professional ice hockey player
 Cosmo Campoli, a Chicago-based sculptor
 María Antonieta Cámpoli, Italian-Venezuelan pageant titleholder, Miss Venezuela in 1972 

It may also refer to any one of several places in Italy:

Campoli Appennino, a municipality in the Province of Frosinone, Lazio
Campoli del Monte Taburno, a municipality in the Province of Benevento, Campania
Campoli, a civil parish of Caulonia (RC), Calabria